Dhiyamigili (Dhivehi: ދިޔަމިގިލި) is one of the inhabited islands of Thaa Atoll.

Geography

Demography

Economy
Dhiyaminili's main economic projects are in carpentry, rope making, collecting shells, masonry and fishing.

References

Islands of the Maldives